Gynandrocarpa is a genus of ascidian tunicates in the family Styelidae.

Species within the genus Gynandrocarpa include:
 Gynandrocarpa placenta (Herdman, 1886)

Species names currently considered to be synonyms:
 Gynandrocarpa borealis (Gottschaldt, 1894): synonym of Kukenthalia borealis (Gottschaldt, 1894) 
 Gynandrocarpa domuncula Michaelsen, 1904: synonym of Polyandrocarpa placenta (Herdman, 1886) 
 Gynandrocarpa imthurni Herdman, 1906: synonym of Eusynstyela latericius (Sluiter, 1904) 
 Gynandrocarpa latericius Sluiter, 1904: synonym of Eusynstyela latericius (Sluiter, 1904) 
 Gynandrocarpa maxima Sluiter, 1904: synonym of Polycarpa anguinea (Sluiter, 1898) 
 Gynandrocarpa michaelseni (Sluiter, 1900): synonym of Chorizocarpa michaelseni (Sluiter, 1900) 
 Gynandrocarpa misanthropos Monniot, 1978: synonym of Dextrocarpa misanthropos Monniot, 1978 
 Gynandrocarpa nigricans (Heller, 1878): synonym of Polycarpa nigricans Heller, 1878 
 Gynandrocarpa purpurea Sluiter, 1904: synonym of Chorizocarpa sydneyensis (Herdman, 1891) 
 Gynandrocarpa quadricornulis Sluiter, 1904: synonym of Symplegma brakenhielmi (Michaelsen, 1904) 
 Gynandrocarpa similis Sluiter, 1904: synonym of Symplegma brakenhielmi (Michaelsen, 1904) 
 Gynandrocarpa solitaris Millar, 1955: synonym of Dextrocarpa solitaris Millar, 1955 
 Gynandrocarpa systematica Sluiter, 1904: synonym of Chorizocarpa sydneyensis (Herdman, 1891) 
 Gynandrocarpa unilateralis Michaelsen, 1900: synonym of Gynandrocarpa placenta (Herdman, 1886)

References

Stolidobranchia
Tunicate genera